The 22nd Infantry Division was a specialized German infantry division in World War II. Its primary method of transportation was gliders. The division played a significant role in the development of modern day air assault operations.

History
Created as 22. Infanterie-Division in 1935, one regiment participated in the 1939 Invasion of Poland; the rest of the division stayed in garrison on the Siegfried Line in case of a French attack in defense of Poland. The division retrained as 22. Luftlande-Division (Air Landing Division) for rapid tactical deployment to capture enemy airbases and performed in that role during the invasion of the Netherlands suffering heavy losses during the failed Battle for The Hague (operation “Fall Festung”), and afterward advanced into France operating as ordinary ground infantry. Though planned for use in its air-landing role for the Battle of Crete, it was replaced by another division at the last minute. It joined Army Group South in Operation Barbarossa (1941), attacking from Romania and, operating exclusively as ordinary ground infantry, helped storm Sevastopol in the Crimea (1942).

The unit was thereafter transferred to Crete for garrison duty in "Fortress Crete" and mop-up operations in the Aegean, playing a major role in the Battle of Leros under the command of Generalmajor Friedrich-Wilhelm Müller.

During September 1943, forces of the unit committed the atrocities of the Viannos massacres.

On 26 April 1944 the divisional commander, Generalmajor Heinrich Kreipe, was abducted by a British Special Operations Executive team led by Major Patrick Leigh Fermor and Capt Bill Stanley Moss. Kreipe's car was ambushed at night on the way from the divisional headquarters at Ano Archanes to the Villa Ariadne at Knossos and he was taken cross-country over the mountains to the south coast where he and his captors were picked up by a British vessel near Rodakino on 14 May. This operation was later portrayed in the book Ill Met by Moonlight (1950) written by Moss based on his wartime diaries, later adapted as a film of the same name. In late summer 1944, forces of the division were involved in more atrocities in Anogeia and Amari.

Withdrawn to the mainland in autumn 1944, the 22. Infanterie-Division spent the rest of the war in anti-partisan operations in Macedonia, Serbia and Bosnia and Herzegovina in southeastern Europe, was renamed 22. Volksgrenadier-Division in March 1945, as it withdrew to Slavonia and finally surrendered to Yugoslav forces at the end of the war in May in Slovenia.

Commanders
 Generalleutnant Adolf Strauß (15 Oct 1935 – 10 Nov 1938)
 Generalleutnant Hans Graf von Sponeck (10 Nov 1938 – 10 Oct 1941)
 General der Infanterie Ludwig Wolff (10 Oct 1941 – 1 Aug 1942)
 General der Infanterie Friedrich-Wilhelm Müller (1 Aug 1942 – 15 Feb 1944)
 Generalmajor Heinrich Kreipe (15 Feb 1944 – 26 Apr 1944)
 Generalleutnant Helmut Friebe (1 May 1944 – 15 April 1945)
 Generalmajor Gerhard Kühne (16 April 1945 – 15 May 1945)

Orders of Battle

May 1940 – Fall Gelb
 Divisionstab
 Infanterie-Regiment 16
 Infanterie-Regiment 47
 Infanterie-Regiment 65
 Artillerie-Regiment 22
 Panzerabwehr-Abteilung 22
 Aufklärungs-Abteilung 22
 Feldersatz-Bataillon 22
 Nachrichten-Bataillon 22
 Pionier-Bataillon 22

July 1944 – Crete
 Divisionstab
 Grenadier-Regiment 16
 Grenadier-Regiment 47
 Grenadier-Regiment 65
 Artillerie-Regiment 22
 Panzerjäger-Abteilung 22
 Aufklärungs-Abteilung 22
 Feldersatz-Bataillon 22
 Nachrichten-Bataillon 22
 Pionier-Bataillon 22
 Flak-Bataillon 22

References

Works consulted
 
 

Military units and formations established in 1934
Crete in World War II
Airborne divisions of Germany in World War II
Military units and formations disestablished in 1945
Military units and formations of Germany in Yugoslavia in World War II
War crimes of the Wehrmacht